Mount Foch is a  mountain summit located on the border of Alberta and British Columbia on the Continental Divide. It was named in 1918 after Marshall Ferdinand Foch.

The first ascent of the mountain was made in 1930 by Kate (Katie) Gardiner and Walter Feuz. The duo also made the first ascents of nearby Mount Sarrail and Mount Lyautey that same year.


Geology
Mount Foch is composed of sedimentary rock laid down during the Precambrian to Jurassic periods. Formed in shallow seas, this sedimentary rock was pushed east and over the top of younger rock during the Laramide orogeny.

Climate
Based on the Köppen climate classification, Mount Foch is located in a subarctic climate with cold, snowy winters, and mild summers. Temperatures can drop below −20 C with wind chill factors below −30 C. In terms of favorable weather, June through September are the best months to climb Mount Foch.

See also
 List of peaks on the British Columbia–Alberta border

References

External links
 Mount Foch weather: Mountain Forecast

Three-thousanders of Alberta
Three-thousanders of British Columbia
Canadian Rockies